Lake Lestijärvi is a medium-sized lake, located in Lestijärvi, Central Ostrobothnia, Finland. It is the 64th biggest lake in Finland. Lake Lestijärvi is a well-known site for fishing big perch and pike. All the region's lakes are shallow, Lestijärvi also.

See also
List of lakes in Finland

References
 Lestijärvi in Järviwiki 

Lestijärvi